Next of Kin is a 1997 book by Roger Fouts combining his experiences with Washoe and other chimpanzees who learned American Sign Language, and a polemic in favor of great ape personhood.

References
Next of Kin: what chimpanzees have taught me about who we are. written by Roger Fouts. New York: William Morrow and Company, 1997. 

Natural history books